Me Kaksi is a 1920 poetry collection by Finnish poet Aaro Hellaakoski. The poems use satirical tones reflecting feelings of inadequacy and loneliness.

Sources

External links
 

1920 poetry books
Finnish poetry collections